Sharon Cable Fanning-Otis (born December 15, 1954) is the former women's basketball program head coach at Mississippi State. During her 17-year head coach career with the Bulldogs, then team had a 281–232 (.548) record. During her tenure, she posted 6 winning seasons and 7 postseason appearances. She led MSU to its inaugural appearance in the AP Final Poll, and to its first two 20-win seasons. The 2003 team went 24–8, and finished in the Top 10. For the 2004 season, MSU set a program record for longest winning streak at 12 games. She retired after the 2011–2012 season.

She attended Chattanooga High School, and later University of Tennessee at Chattanooga where she played basketball and volleyball. She started her career as a graduate-assistant coach in 1975 at Tennessee. From 1976 to 1978, she served as the women's volleyball program head coach at UTC; she would serve as women's basketball program head coach until 1987. From 1987 to 1995 she served as the Kentucky Wildcats women's basketball program head coach with an overall career record at 608–457.

Head coaching record

See also
List of college women's basketball coaches with 600 wins

References

External links
MStateAthletics.com Bio

Living people
American women's basketball coaches
Chattanooga Mocs women's basketball coaches
Kentucky Wildcats women's basketball coaches
Mississippi State Bulldogs women's basketball coaches
1953 births